Father Christmas is a Christmas gift-bringer. 

Father Christmas may also refer to:

 "Father Christmas" (song), a 1977 single by the English group The Kinks
 Father Christmas (book), a 1973 children's graphic novel by Raymond Briggs
 Father Christmas (1991 film), animated short based on the book
 Father Christmas (film series), television film trilogy first broadcast between 2016 and 2018
 Father Christmas (computer worm), released in December 1988

See also
 Christmas gift-bringer
 Santa Claus